Romantic Journey  is an album released in 1977 by Philadelphia, Pennsylvania jazz drummer Norman Connors. The album charted at number ten on the jazz albums chart.

Track listing
Side one
 "You Are Everything" (Thom Bell, Linda Creed) – 7:00
Arranged and conducted by Jerry Peters
Lead vocals – Eleanore Mills
 "Once I've Been There" (Phillip Mitchell) – 5:49
Arranged and conducted by Jerry Peters
Lead vocals – Phillip Mitchell
 "Destination Moon" (Phillip Mitchell) – 4:38
Arranged by Hubert Eaves, Reggie Lucas, and Ian Underwood (synthesizer)
Lead vocals – Phillip Mitchell
 "Romantic Journey" (Norman Connors) 5:26
Arranged by Hubert Eaves and Reggie Lucas
Electric guitar – Ray Gomez

Side two
 "Last Tango in Paris" (Gato Barbieri) – 6:43
Arranged and conducted by Jerry Peters
 "For You Everything" (Jerry Peters) – 5:52
Arranged and conducted by Jerry Peters
Lead vocals – Eleanore Mills and Phillip Mitchell
 "Thembi" (Pharoah Sanders) – 8:04
Arranged by Norman Connors
Soprano saxophone – Pharoah Sanders

Charts

Singles

Personnel

Musicians
 Norman Connors – main performer, timpani, drums, percussion
 Charles Veal Jr. – concertmaster
 Myrna Mathews, and Julia, Maxine and Orrin Waters – backing vocals
 Lee Ritenour – acoustic and electric guitar
 Reggie Lucas – electric guitar
 Hubert Eaves and Jerry Peters – acoustic and electric piano, clavinet
 Ian Underwood – synthesizer
 Gary Bartz – alto saxophone
 Fred Jackson – bass and alto flute, alto saxophone, clarinet
 Ernie Watts – bass and alto flute, tenor saxophone
 Bill Green – Bass, alto and piccolo flute, tenor saxophone, clarinet
 Oscar Brashear, Chuck Findley, Gene Goe, and Gary Grant – trumpet
 George Bohannon, Dick Hyde, and Charlie Loper – trombone
 Maurice Spears – bass trombone
 Sidney Muldrow and Marnie Robinson – French horn
 Jerry Peters – harpsichord
 Willie Weeks – bass
 Victor Feldman – percussion, bells, vibraphone
 Kenneth Nash – congas, percussion, Paiste cymbal, gong
 Bobbye Hall – congas and bongos

Production
 Jerry Schoenbaum – executive producer
 Skip Drinkwater – producer
 John Mills and Don Murray – audio engineers
 George Belle and Linda Tyler – engineers assistants
 Bernie Grundman – mastering
 Don Murray and Skip Drinkwater – mixing

References

External links
 Norman Connors-Romantic Journey at Discogs

1977 albums
Norman Connors albums
Buddah Records albums